"Jump, Jump" is a 2005 single by DJ Tomekk from the album Numma Eyns. It features Fler and introduces G-Hot. The song peaked at No. 3 in Germany. It samples the song "Jump" by Kris Kross, though with the exception of the words "Jump, Jump" lyrics are in German. It was Tomekk's last single released. The music video features Tomekk parachuting into a club where Fler and G-Hot rap the lyrics of the song.

Track listing

Charts

References 

2005 singles
2005 songs